"Bend Me, Shape Me" is a song written by Scott English and Larry Weiss. It was first recorded by The Outsiders as a track on their album In in 1966. The best-known version of the song in the US is the 1967 single released by The American Breed that peaked at No. 5 on the US Billboard Hot 100 in early 1968, No. 3 in South Africa, and No. 24 on the UK Singles Chart.

The American Breed's 2:05 single mix of this song was sped-up during mastering for release, while the widely available original 2:25 version was done at a normal speed. The following year, The American Breed released their last single, "Anyway That You Want Me", which borrowed its title phrase from "Bend Me, Shape Me". Co-songwriter Scott English later went on to write and sing "Brandy", which Barry Manilow later covered as his 1974 breakout hit "Mandy".

The video was also released. The band members are seen working out in a gym and performing on stage.

Chart history

Weekly charts

Year-end charts

Cover versions
There have been many other recordings of "Bend Me, Shape Me". The first version was released by The Models in 1966 on the MGM label. Other notable versions include one by Amen Corner with slightly altered lyrics, which reached No. 3 in the UK Singles Chart in 1968. There was also a hit disco single on Ariola/Hansa by Austrian singer Gilla in 1978.

The Kidsongs Kids sing this song on their 1987 video/album: "The Wonderful World of Sports".

The American Breed version of the song was included in the soundtrack of the 2018 neo-noir thriller US film Bad Times at the El Royale.

See also
 List of 1960s one-hit wonders in the United States

References

1966 songs
1967 singles
Songs written by Scott English
Songs written by Larry Weiss
Deram Records singles
Amen Corner (band) songs
Number-one singles in New Zealand